Parajitos (lit. "Small birds") is a customs and border control complex along Chile Route 215 near Cardenal Antonio Samoré Pass (Puyehue Pass). Administratively it is part of the commune of Puyehue in Osorno Province, Los Lagos Region. The National Statistics Institute lists the settlement as a hamlet having 27 inhabitants as of 2017.

References

Populated places in Osorno Province